Germán Rivera Díaz (born July 6, 1960) is a Puerto Rican former professional baseball third baseman. He played for the Los Angeles Dodgers and Houston Astros of Major League Baseball (MLB) in the 1980s.

Career
Rivera was signed as an undrafted free agent by the Los Angeles Dodgers on December 20, 1977. He played in the minors for the Lethbridge Dodgers (1978), Clinton Dodgers (1978–1979), Lodi Dodgers (1979, 1981), Vero Beach Dodgers (1980), San Antonio Dodgers (1982) and Albuquerque Dukes (1982–1985).

He was selected by the Oakland Athletics in the rule 5 draft in 1983, but returned to the Dodgers at the end of spring training when he failed to make the Athletics roster.

Rivera made his major league debut as a defensive replacement on September 2, 1983 against the Montreal Expos and made his first start the next day. He was the Dodgers opening day starter at third base in 1984, playing in 94 games that season and finishing with a .260 batting average.

On July 15, 1985 he was traded to the Houston Astros (with Rafael Montalvo) in exchange for Enos Cabell. Spent most of the season with the Astros AAA team, the Tucson Toros and only appeared in 13 games for the Astros.

Rivera bounced around the minors for a few years after that, playing with the Nashville Sounds & Toledo Mud Hens (Detroit Tigers organization -1986–1987), Denver Zephyrs (Milwaukee Brewers organization -1988), Richmond Braves (Atlanta Braves organization -1989), Indianapolis Indians (Montreal Expos organization-1990). After that he played in Japan (Kintetsu Buffaloes) for a year.

See also
 List of Major League Baseball players from Puerto Rico

External links

1960 births
Living people
Albuquerque Dukes players
Clinton Dodgers players
Denver Zephyrs players
Houston Astros players
Indianapolis Indians players
Kintetsu Buffaloes players
Lethbridge Dodgers players
Lodi Dodgers players
Los Angeles Dodgers players
Major League Baseball players from Puerto Rico
Major League Baseball third basemen
Nashville Sounds players
Nippon Professional Baseball first basemen
Nippon Professional Baseball third basemen
Olmecas de Tabasco players
People from Santurce, Puerto Rico
Pericos de Puebla players
Potros de Minatitlán players
Puerto Rican expatriate baseball players in Japan
Puerto Rican expatriate baseball players in Mexico
Richmond Braves players
Rojos del Águila de Veracruz players
San Antonio Dodgers players
Sultanes de Monterrey players
Toledo Mud Hens players
Tucson Toros players